Frank Ellis Bamford (November 15, 1865 – June 27, 1932) was an American Brigadier general active during World War I.

Early life
Bamford was born in Milwaukee, Wisconsin. In 1887, he graduated from the University of Wisconsin–Milwaukee with a bachelor's degree in mechanical engineering.

Military career
On July 14, 1891, Bamford enlisted in the Second Infantry and quickly progressed from corporal sergeant to sergeant major of the regiment. On October 7, 1893 he was commissioned a second lieutenant in the Fifth Infantry.

In April 1898, he was promoted to first lieutenant and transferred to the 15th Infantry. On February 2, 1901, Bamford became a captain and went to the 28th Infantry. While in command of Company G, 28th Infantry, he served in the Philippines during the Philippine–American War.

During World War I, he commanded a battalion and then took command of the 16th Infantry Regiment. He then commanded 2nd Infantry Brigade, 1st Division. Bamford was promoted to brigadier general of the National Army on August 8, 1918. He next commanded 1st Division. He organized and conducted the II Corps School and also commanded the army school in Langres, France. He later succeeded Clarence Ransom Edwards as commander of the 26th Division.

Bamford retired on August 5, 1921.

Awards
For his service, Bamford was awarded the Army Distinguished Service Medal, the citation for which reads:

Death and legacy
Bamford died at the age of sixty-six on June 27, 1932. He was buried at Arlington National Cemetery.

References

Bibliography
Davis, Henry Blaine Jr. Generals in Khaki. Raleigh, NC: Pentland Press, 1998.  

1865 births
1932 deaths
United States Army generals
Recipients of the Distinguished Service Medal (US Army)
University of Wisconsin–Madison College of Engineering alumni
Military personnel from Milwaukee
Burials at Arlington National Cemetery
United States Army generals of World War I
United States Army Infantry Branch personnel